Chalunka (also known as Chalunkha or Chulungkha) is a small mountainous village, in Nubra tehsil and Turtuk community development block, in Chorbat area of Shyok River valley in Ladakh, India. At the end of the Indo-Pakistani War of 1947, it was on the cease-fire line agreed between the India and Pakistan. After the Indo-Pakistani War of 1971, the village came under the jurisdiction of Indian-administered Jammu & Kashmir.

History

Chalunka, along with Tyakshi, Turtuk and Thang, became part of the Pakistani-administered Northern Areas following the Indo-Pakistani War of 1947–1948. 

During the  Indo-Pakistani War of 1971,  on 10 December 1971, the Ladakh Scouts under the command of Major Chewang Rinchen cleared the village of the Pakistani forces (two companies of Karakoram Scouts). Advancing further, they attacked Turtuk on 11 December, and captured it by 14 December.

After the Simla Agreement of 1972, they were incorporated into the Indian state of Jammu and Kashmir. Following the reorganisation of the state in August 2019, these villages became part of the union territory of Ladakh.

Demographics
According to the 2011 census of India, Chulungkha has 42 households. The effective literacy rate (i.e. the literacy rate of population excluding children aged 6 and below) is 91.1%.

See also
Indo-Pakistani War of 1971

References

 Sources
 
 
 
 

Villages in Nubra tehsil
Indo-Pakistani War of 1971